The 2021–22 Stade Malherbe Caen season was the 109th season of the club since its creation in 1913. Caen participated in Ligue 2, the second division of French football, for the third year in a row after relegation from Ligue 1 in 2019, and also competed in the Coupe de France.

First-team squad
As of 20 February 2022.

Competitions

Ligue 2

League table

Results summary

Results by round

Matches

References

Caen
Stade Malherbe Caen seasons